Public schools in New Orleans, Louisiana, were desegregated to a significant degree for a period of almost seven years during the Reconstruction Era following the Civil War of the United States. Desegregation of this scale was not seen again in the Southern United States until after the 1954 federal court ruling Brown v. Board of Education established that segregated facilities were unconstitutional.
 
The 1867 Louisiana constitution, with its provision that racial segregation was no longer to be permitted in public facilities, marked the beginning of three years of legal wrangling and evasion by whites resistant to the idea of integrated schools. A court decision on school desegregation in December 1870 was acknowledged by organizers on both sides of the issue to be a decisive one, and integration of New Orleans's public schools began in earnest in 1870.
 
Although initially there was much vocal white opposition to integrated schools, and the mass media predicted the collapse of the public school system in New Orleans, ultimately, enrolment increased, and the performance of both black and white students improved in desegregated schools during the brief period when these institutions were allowed to flourish.: 667–669  At the height of the trend, approximately one-third of public schools in New Orleans were desegregated to a significant degree, and these schools were the top-performing schools in their districts.: 670 

There continued to be white opposition to the idea of desegregated schools despite their success. Opponents of interracial cooperation used varied tactics, from newspaper editorials to political posturing to violence, to express their point of view. In mid-1874, a congressional civil rights bill removed from the constitution the clause of desegregated schools, thus weakening the position of New Orleans's burgeoning desegregated public school system.

The Louisiana constitution was rewritten in 1879 to once again allow for segregated public institutions. In 1898, another change banned desegregated public facilities altogether.

See also

New Orleans school desegregation crisis
Ruby Bridges

References

External links
Leona Tate Foundation

Education in New Orleans
School segregation in the United States